A pilgrimage church is a church to which pilgrimages are regularly made, or a church along a pilgrimage route, like the Way of St. James, that is visited by pilgrims.

Pilgrimage churches are often located by the graves of saints, or hold portraits to which miraculous properties are ascribed or saintly relics that are safeguarded by the church for their veneration. Such relics may include the bones, books or pieces of clothing of the saints, occasionally also fragments of the cross of Jesus, pieces of the crown of thorns, the nails with which he was fixed to the cross and other similar objects. Pilgrimage churches were also built at places where miracles took place.

List of Roman Catholic pilgrimage churches 

Churches are listed in alphabetical order of the sites in or near where they are located.

Austria 

 Ardning, Styria: Pilgrimage Church of Frauenberg
 Bad Leonfelden, Upper Austria: Pilgrimage Church of Maria Schutz am Bründl
 Berg bei Rohrbach, Upper Austria: Pilgrimage Church of Maria Trost 
 Bergheim near Salzburg: Pilgrimage Church of Maria Plain
 Christkindl, Upper Austria: Pilgrimage Church of Christkindl
 Fernitz, Styria: Pilgrimage Church of Maria Trost (Styria)
 Gaflenz, Upper Austria: St. Sebald am saintnstein
 Graz, Styria: Maria Grün, Mariatrost Basilica
 Gurk, Carinthia, Gurk Cathedral (grave of Saint Hemma of Gurk)
 Gutenstein, Lower Austria: Our Lady of Perpetual Help
 Heiligengrab, Bleiburg, Carinthia
 Horn, Lower Austria: Maria Dreieichen
 Kaltenberg, Upper Austria
 Kaltenbrunn, Tyrol
 Linz, Upper Austria: Pöstlingberg
 Maria Dornach (Mitteldorf), Großkirchheim, Carinthia
 Maria Gail, Villach
 Maria Hilf ob Guttaring, Carinthia
 Maria Laach am Jauerling, Lower Austria
 Maria Loreto, Saint Andrew i. L., Carinthia
 Maria Rain, Carinthia
 St Mary's Church, Maria Saal, Carinthia
 Maria Schmolln, Upper Austria
 Pilgrimage Church of Maria Schnee (Maria Luggau), Lesachtal, Carinthia
 Maria Schnee (at about ten places in Austria and several places in Germany and neighbouring countries)
 Mariastein, Tyrol
 Maria Taferl (most important pilgrimage site in Lower Austria)
 Maria Waitschach, Guttaring, Carinthia
 Mariazell, Styria – which in 2003–2005 was the venue for the Central European Catholics Day
 Molln, Upper Austria: Pilgrimage Church of Frauenstein
 Pottenstein: Pilgrimage Church of Maria Trost im Elend
 Poysdorf, Lower Austria: Maria Bründl
 Saalfelden, Salzburg: Pilgrimage Church of Maria Kirchenthal
 Sankt Jakob im Rosental, Carinthia: Pilgrimage Church of Maria Elend
 St. Wolfgang, Upper Austria
 Pilgrimage Church of St. Wolfgang ob Grades, Metnitz, Carinthia
 Schollach, Lower Austria: Maria Steinparz
 Seggauberg, Styria: Pilgrimage Church on the Frauenberg near Leibnitz
 Sonntagberg, Lower Austria
 Our Dear Lady, Hochfeistritz, Eberstein, Carinthia
 Zistersdorf, Lower Austria: Maria Moos (oldest spring shrine in Lower Austria)

Brazil 
 Aparecida: great Marian sanctuary

Croatia 
 Trsat, Dalmatia, Croatia: Pilgrimage Shrine of Our Lady of Trsat, Cathedral of St Vitus

Czech Republic 
 Chlum Svaté Maří
 Družec: pilgrimage church of St Mary of the Assumption
 Brno-Tuřany: pilgrimage church of Church of the Annunciation
 Příbram: Svatá Hora Abbey

France 

 Eschau: St Trophimus' Church with the relics of Sophia the Martyr and her daughters Faith, Hope and Charity
 Haguenau: Basilica of Our Lady of Marienthal
 Le Puy-en-Velay: pilgrimage church of Notre-Dame du Puy
 Lisieux: sanctuary of saint Teresa of the Child Jesus
 Lourdes: site of Marian apparitions with the healing spring
 Neuwiller-lès-Saverne: Église Saint-Pierre-et-Saint-Paul, with the relics of local saint Adelphus
 Marseille: pilgrimage church of Notre-Dame de la Garde
 Mont St. Michel: St. Michel
 Paray-le-Monial: sanctuary of saint Margaret Mary Alacoque and the Sacred Heart
 Paris: Sainte-Chapelle with the Crown of Thorns
 Ronchamp: pilgrimage chapel of Notre Dame du Haut

Germany 

 Abensberg (Bavaria): Pilgrimage Church of St Mary of the Assumption in the village of Allersdorf
 Abtsgmünd: pilgrimage church of the Sacrifice of Mary (Mariä Opferung) in the village of Hohenstadt
 Aldenhoven: chapel of grace, parish church, Marian pilgrimage
 Altötting: Shrine of Our Lady, Marian pilgrimage
 Andechs: Pilgrimage Church of St. Nicholas and St. Elizabeth, Maria pilgrimage, eucharistic pilgrimage
 Amberg: Pilgrimage Church of Our Lady of Perpetual Help
 Armsheim (Rheinhessen): former Pilgrimage church of the Precious Blood of Christ
 Beratzhausen: pilgrimage church of Our Lady of Perpetual Help
 Bergen bei Neuburg: pilgrimage church of the Holy Cross
 Berlin-Mariendorf: Pilgrimage Church of Maria Frieden
 Beselich: Pilgrimage Chapel of Our Lady of Perpetual Help
 Bettbrunn: pilgrimage church of St Salvator
 Biberbach: St. James the Great, St Lawrence and the Holy Cross - s Herrgöttle von Biberbach
 Birenbach: Pilgrimage Church of the Dolorous Mother of God
 Birkenstein: pilgrimage chapel of St Mary of the Assumption
 Blieskastel: Holy Cross Chapel, Madonna with the Pfeilen
 Bogen: Bogenberg, St Mary of the Assumption
 Bonn: Kreuzbergkirche
 Bruchhausen (Landkreis Neuwied): Marian pilgrimage church of St. John the Baptist (Zuflucht der Sünder)
 Bussen (Upper Swabia): pilgrimage church of St. John the Baptist
 Cologne: Cologne Cathedral - SS. Peter and Mary (Epiphany)
 Cologne: St. Maria in der Kupfergasse (Black Madonna of Cologne)
 Dahenfeld: St Remigius' Church
 Deggendorf: Pilgrimage Church of the Holy Sepulchre
 Deggingen (Upper Filst valley): Ave Maria (pilgrimage church)
 Dettelbach: pilgrimage church of Maria im Sand
 Dießen am Ammersee: Marienmünster church in the district of Landsberg am Lech in Bavaria
 Düren: St Anne's Church - veneration of the "head of Anna" - a head relic of the mother of Mary
 Durmersheim: pilgrimage church of Maria Bickesheim
 Eckartshausen (Werneck): pilgrimage church of the Visitation of Mary
 Eggerode: pilgrimage church of Birth of the Virgin Mary
 Eibingen: pilgrimage church of St. Hildegard and St. John the Baptisth - burial church of Saint Hildegard and sanctuary for the Eibingen relic treasure.
 Ellwangen: pilgrimage church of St. Mary of Loreto
 Elmstein: pilgrimage church of the Mother of God
 Engelberg: St. Michael over the Main
 Ettal, (Upper Bavaria): Pilgrimage Church of St Mary of the Assumption
 Ettenberg (Marktschellenberg): Pilgrimage Church of the Visitation of Mary
 Etzelsbach, (Thüringen): Pilgrimage chapel of Etzelsbach
 Fahrenberg: pilgrimage to the Holy Hill of the Visitation of Mary
 Freystadt: pilgrimage church of Our Lady of Perpetual Help
 Friedberg: pilgrimage church of Herrgottsruh
 Fuchsmühl: pilgrimage church of Our Lady of Perpetual Help
 Fürstenfeldbruck: Fürstenfeld Abbey dedicated to the Assumption of the Blessed Virgin Mary (Mariä Himmelfahrt) in Bavaria
 Gößweinstein: Basilica, pilgrimage church and basilica of the Holy Trinity (Heilige Dreifaltigkeit)
 Gottsbüren (North Hesse)
 Haltern-Bergbossendorf: pilgrimage chapel of Saint Anne
 Hennef-Bödingen: Pilgrimage Church of the Dolorous Mother of God
 Herzfeld (Lippetal): pilgrimage church of St. Ida
 Hirschberg an der Bergstraße: pilgrimage church of St. John the Baptist
 Hohenpeißenberg: pilgrimage chapel and church on the Hoher Peißenberg
 Kälberau: pilgrimage church of Maria zum rauhen Wind
 Kevelaer: chapel of grace, candle chapel and St Mary's Basilica
 Kippenheim: pilgrimage chapel of Maria Frieden
 Klausen (Eifel): pilgrimage church of the Visitation of Mary
 Kleinenberg near Lichtenau in East Westphalia: pilgrimage chapel
 Koblenz-Arenberg: pilgrimage church of St. Nicholas with the Reverend Kraus' Assets (Landscape illustrated Bible)
 Koblenz-Lützel: pilgrimage church of Our Lady of Perpetual Help
 Kößlarn: Marian pilgrimage (Bavaria)
 Küblingen (Lower Saxony): Pilgrimage Church of St. Mary
 Lautenbach: Late Gothic pilgrimage church of Coronation of the Virgin
 Leipferdingen: pilgrimage church of St. Michael
 Leverkusen-Alkenrath: Gezelin Chapel
 Löffingen (Baden-Württemberg): Witterschneekreuz
 Ludwigshafen am Rhein-Oggersheim: castle and Pilgrimage Church of St Mary of the Assumption (Ludwigshafen) - pilgrimage to the holy house of Loreto, Marche, pilgrimage site for the Electorate of the Palatinate
 Lünen: St Mary's Church
 Marienberg (Burghausen)
 Maria Gern (Berchtesgaden): Pilgrimage Church of Maria Gern
 Mainz-Gonsenheim: Nothelfer Chapel
 Maria Steinbach: Pilgrimage Church of Maria Steinbach
 Marienheide: pilgrimage church of the Visitation of Mary
 Marienthal (Westerwald)
 Marienweiher (Marktleugast): pilgrimage basilica the Visitation of Mary
 Moosbronn: pilgrimage church Our Lady of Perpetual Help 
 Mussenhausen: Our Dear Lady of Mount Carmel
 Neunburg vorm Wald: Mater Dolorosa (Ortsteil Katzdorf, Oberpfalz)
 Neuss: Quirinusmünster (1209-1230)
 Nußdorf am Inn (Bavaria): the Visitation of Mary (Kirchwald)
 Nothgottes: Abbey near Eibingen in Rheingau, pilgrimage to the Gnadenbild Nothgottes
 Oberfell: Pilgrimage Church of Bleidenberg and Pilgerstein, hilltop pilgrimage to Holy Trinity Church
 Ottersweier: pilgrimage church of Maria Linden
 Ottobeuren: SS. Alexander and Theodore
 Pfaffen-Schwabenheim: Stiftskirche (Pfaffen-Schwabenheim), pilgrimage to the Maria, Königin des Friedens, um 1750 aus dem Cologneer Karmel St. Maria vom Frieden (Cologne) geschenkt
 Planegg: Maria Eich Chapel
 Raitenbuch: St. Blasius
 Ramsau bei Berchtesgaden: Maria Kunterweg

 Rechberg near Schwäbisch Gmünd: St. Maria on the Hohenrechberg
 Regensburg: Alten Kapelle or Basilica of the Nativity of Our Lady Regensburg (Kollegiatstift unserer Lieben Frau zur alten Kapelle) in Regensburg in Bavaria
 Remagen: Apollinaris Church
 Rengersbrunn: Statue of the Mother of God
 Reuth bei Erbendorf: Pilgrimage Church of St Mary of the Assumption in the village of Premenreuth
 Rieste (Lower Saxony): pilgrimage church of St. John the Baptist on the Lage, pilgrimage to the Lage Cross
 Rohr: Braunau in Rohr Abbey dedicated to the Assumption of the Blessed Virgin Mary (Mariä Himmelfahrt) in Niederbayern in Bavaria
 Rütschenhausen: Pilgrimage Church of Maria von der Tann
 Rückers, county of Fulda: Roman Catholic Church of St Mary of the Assumption
 Saint Salvator (Rauenzell, Bavaria) formerly the oldest pilgrimage of the Diocese of Eichstätt
 Saint Bartholomew's: by the Königssee lake in Berchtesgaden Land
 Sandizell: St. Peter Church or Asamkirche Sandizell in Schrobenhausen in Bavaria
 Schmidmuehlen: Pilgrimage church of the Heiligen Dreifaltigkeit auf dem Kreuzberg
 Schönstatt (Vallendar): the Schoenstatt Shrine is an ancient shrine of the Schoenstatt Movement
 Schongau: pilgrimage church of St Mary of the Assumption
 Schwäbisch Gmünd: pilgrimage church of St. Salvator
 Schwandorf: Pilgrimage Church of Our Dear Lady of Kreuzberg
 Scheßlitz: pilgrimage church of Gügel
 Spaichingen: pilgrimage church on the Dreifaltigkeitsberg
 Spabrücken: pilgrimage church of the Black Madonna of Soon
 Bad Staffelstein: Pilgrimage Basilica of the Fourteen Holy Helpers
 Steingaden: Steingaden Abbey in Bavaria, Germany
 Steinhausen: 
 Sulzbach-Rosenberg (Upper Palatinate): Pilgrimage Church of Annaberg
 Swisttal-Buschhoven: Marian pilgrimage site with the "Rosa Mystica"
 Todtmoos (Black Forest): pilgrimage church of Our Dear Lady of Todtmoos

 Tuntenhausen: Papal Basilica St Mary of the Assumption
 Uhldingen-Mühlhofen: Pilgrimage Church of Birnau
 Unterkochen: Marian pilgrimage church of Unterkochen

 Velbert-Neviges: Maria, Königin des Friedens (Mary, Queen of Peace)
 Vierzehnheiligen: Basilica of the Fourteen Holy Helpers
 Vilgertshofen: pilgrimage church of the Dolorous Mother of God
 Volkach: pilgrimage church of Kirchberg, Maria im Weingarten
 Waghäusel: Marian pilgrimage church
 Waldsassen: Holy Trinity Church
 Walldürn: Pilgrimage Church of the Holy Blood (Blood miracle of Walldürn)
 Weihenlinden: pilgrimage church of the Holy Trinity
 Weiler in den Bergen (near Schwäbisch Gmünd): St. Bernhard's on the Bernhardusberg hill
 Weingarten: Weingarten Abbey or St. Martin’s Abbey is a Benedictine monastery on the Martinsberg near Ravensburg at Baden-Württemberg
 Weltenburg: Weltenburg Abbey near Kelheim in Bavaria
 Wemding: pilgrimage church of Maria Brünnlein
 Werl: Pilgrimage Basilica, dedicated to the Visitation
 Old Pilgrimage Church, dedicated to Mary
 Wieskirche: Pilgrimage Church of the Scourged Saviour on the Wies in Steingaden in Bavaria designed by the brothers Johann Baptist and Domenikus Zimmermann
 Willich-Neersen: Little Jerusalem Church
 Bad Wilsnack: St. Nicholas' and the Holy Blood of Wilsnack
 Würzburg: pilgrimage church of the Visitation of Mary Käppele 
 Xanten: pilgrimage church of St. St Mary of the Assumption
 Zell am Harmersbach: Pilgrimage Church of Maria zu den Ketten in the village of Unterharmersbach
 Zwiefalten: Pilgrimage Church of the Minster of Our Dear Lady

Gibraltar 
 Shrine of Our Lady of Europe

Great Britain 

Walsingham: Anglican and Roman Catholic shrine of Our Lady of Walsingham

Holy Land 

Bethlehem: Church of the Nativity
Jerusalem: Church of the Holy Sepulchre
Jericho: Mount of Temptation 
Nazareth: Basilica of the Annunciation 
Sea of Galilee: Church of the Primacy of Saint Peter (also known as the Church of the Multiplication of the Loaves and Fishes)
Mount Carmel: Stella Maris Monastery (also known as the Monastery of Our Lady of Mount Carmel)

Ireland 

Knock: Marian pilgrimage chapel of Our Lady Queen of Ireland
Station Island, Lough Derg: St. Patrick’s Basilica

Italy 
 Amalfi: relics of saint Andrew
 Assisi: papal basilica of saint Francis
 Badia, South Tyrol: Holy Cross Church
 Benevento: relics of saint Bartholomew the Apostle
 Loreto, Marche: Basilica della Santa Casa with Black Madonna
 Manoppello: Volto Santo (Holy Face), i.e. shroud of Jesus or Veil of Veronica
 Monte Cassino: the first monastery of Benedictine monks
 Ortona: the relics of saint Thomas the Apostle
 Padova: sanctuary of saint Anthony
 Pompei: Shrine of the Virgin of the Rosary of Pompei
 Re, Piedmont: Madonna del Sangue in the Valle Vigezzo (Vigezzotal)
 Vatican: Saint Peter's tomb, Holy Lance, grave of John Paul II and many others
 papal basilica Santa Maria Maggiore in Rome: icon of Salus Populi Romani
 papal basilica Santa Croce in Gerusalemme: part of True Cross with Titulus Crucis and Holy Nails
 papal basilica San Giovanni in Laterano: Scala Santa (stairs from the palace of Pilate)
 basilica minor Santa Prassede: pillar upon which Jesus was flogged 
 Salerno: relics of saint Matthew
 Savona: Nostra Signora di Misericordia
 Tirano: Madonna di Tirano
 Torino: Shroud of Turin in the cathedral
 Varese: Madonna del Monte 
 Venice: relics of saint Mark
 Vicenza: Madonna del Monte Berico
 Viterbo: Madonna della Quercia

Lebanon 

Our Lady of Lebanon (Harissa, Keserwan District)
Monastery of Qozhaya (Wadi Qozhaya, Zgharta District)
 Monastery of Saint Maron (Annaya, Byblos District) - Sanctuary of Saint Charbel
 Monastery of Saint Joseph (Jrabta, Batroun District) - Sanctuary of Saint Rafqa
 Monastery of Saints Cyprian and Justina (Kfifan, Batroun District) - Sanctuary of Saint Nimatullah
 Qana Al Jaleel (Qana, Tyre District), where it is believed that Jesus Christ performed His first miracle, transforming water into wine at the Marriage at Cana.

Latvia 
 Basilica of the Assumption (Aglona)

Lithuania 
 Gate of Dawn (Vilnius): Marian sanctuary
 Divine Mercy Sanctuary (Vilnius): the first Divine Mercy image

Mexico 

 Basilica of Our Lady of Guadalupe: very popular place of Marian apparitions

Netherlands 
 Warfhuizen: Our Lady of the Enclosed Garden

Philippines 
 National Shrine of The Divine Mercy, Philippines: dedicated to Divine Mercy
 Divine Mercy Shrine (Misamis Oriental): statue of merciful Jesus
 Simala Shrine: Sibonga Monastery of the Holy Eucharist in Cebu

Poland 

 Góra Świętej Anny: pilgrimage to the Saint Anna (in Śląsk Opolski)
 Bardo: pilgrimage church of the Visitation of Mary (in Dolny Śląsk)
 Divine Mercy Sanctuary (Białystok): with the grave of blessed Michał Sopoćko
 Częstochowa: the most popular (4,000,000 a year) Polish pilgrimage church at Jasna Góra with the miraculous image of the Black Madonna of Częstochowa
 Gidle near Częstochowa: Marian sanctuary
 Gietrzwałd (Warmian-Masurian Voivodeship): Marian pilgrimage in the site of apparitions
 Głogowiec and Świnice Warckie: the place of birth and baptism of saint Faustina Kowalska
 Gniezno Cathedral: with the grave of St. Adalbert of Prague (Św. Wojciech), a major patron of Poland
 Gostyń in Greater Poland: Marian sanctuary
 Góra Kalwaria in Mazovia: calvary
 Kalisz: sanctuary of saint Joseph
 Kalwaria Pacławska near Przemyśl: calvary
 Kalwaria Zebrzydowska near Kraków: calvary
 Kałków-Godów near Kielce: Marian sanctuary
 Kodeń at the Bug river: Marian sanctuary
 Kraków: Wawel Cathedral with the grave of queen Jadwiga of Poland (Królowa Jadwiga)
 Skałka in Kraków: sanctuary of Saint Stanislaus of Szczepanów, a major patron of Poland 
 Divine Mercy Sanctuary (Kraków) also known as Łagiewniki: world center of the Divine Mercy with the grave of saint Faustina Kowalska and the most popular version of Divine Mercy image (near by the Center of John Paul II)
 Ludźmierz: pilgrimage church with the Mother of God as Queen (Gaździna) of Podhale
 Licheń Stary near Konin: very popular new Basilica of Our Lady of Licheń in the site of an apparition
 Łobżenica-Górka Klasztorna in Krajna: the site of Marian apparitions
 Niepokalanów in Mazovia: sanctuary of the Immaculata as well as saint Maksymilian Kolbe
 Pakość near Inowrocław: calvary
 Piekary Śląskie: the main Marian sanctuary of Górny Śląsk
 Divine Mercy Sanctuary (Płock): the site of the first apparition of Divine Mercy image to saint Faustina Kowalska
 Rokitno in Lubusz Voivodeship: Marian sanctuary
 Skrzatusz near Piła: Marian sanctuary
 Studzianna near Radom: Marian sanctuary
 Święta Lipka (Warmian-Masurian Voivodeship): pilgrimage to Our Lady of Holy Linden in the site of apparitions
 Święty Krzyż near Kielce: sanctuary of the Holy Cross, in the past the biggest in Poland
 Wadowice near Kraków: the place of birth of John Paul II
 Wambierzyce near Kłodzko: Marian pilgrimage and calvary
 Warsaw: St. Andrew Bobola sanctuary 
 Temple of Divine Providence in Warsaw: national sanctuary
 St. Stanislaus Kostka Church, Warsaw: the grave of blessed Jerzy Popiełuszko
 Wejherowo in Kaszuby: calvary

Portugal 
 Fátima: important Marian pilgrimage site
 Nazaré: Nossa Senhora da Nazaré (Our Dear Lady of Nazareth)

Slovakia 
 Šaštín-Stráže: Basilica of the Seven Sorrows of St. Mary, Šaštín
 Marianka: Church of the Birth of the Virgin Mary
 Turzovka

Spain 
 Cathedral of Santiago de Compostela

Switzerland 
 Einsiedeln (Schwyz): Black Madonna
 Locarno (Tessin): pilgrimage church of Madonna del Sasso
 Ziteil (Graubünden): pilgrimage church auf 
 Luthern Bad (Lucerne): pilgrimage church of Maria-Heilbronn

Turkey 
 House of the Virgin Mary, near Ephesos

See also 

Christian pilgrimage
List of Christian pilgrimage sites
New Testament places associated with Jesus

Types of church buildings
Pilgrimage routes

fr:Pèlerinage#Christianisme
it:Santuario
la:Sanctuarium